Adrian Abraham 'Adi' Jacobs (born 14 August 1980) is a South African former rugby union footballer who played for the  provincially and The Sharks in Super Rugby.

Playing career
At high school, Jacobs was often riled and made fun of because of his small stature. Often being referred to by the nickname "Knob-Kirie", which loosely translates as Toffo-Luxe. Jacobs represented the Western Province Schools team at the annual Craven Week tournament in 1998 and was selected for the SA Schools team. He made his provincial debut for the Falcons in 2000.

Jacobs made his Springboks debut in 2001 against Italy in Genoa. A year later he came on as a replacement in the humiliating 53–3 loss against England at Twickenham and did not feature again for the Springboks for another six years. He returned to the South African side a year after they had won the World Cup and he managed to hold down a permanent position at outside centre alongside Jean de Villiers, in a Springbok backline that was still struggling to find its best configuration.

Playing for the Sharks, Adi missed out on a 2006 Currie Cup semi-final spot after sustaining an injury in the penultimate match, in a season where he gained selection in 16 matches despite being hampered by injury.

He was the first choice No 13 during 2008, by then being a very experienced midfielder, having played provincial rugby for more than a decade. South Africa trounced Australia 53–8 at Ellis Park, Johannesburg in August 2008. With five minutes into the second half Jean de Villiers off-loaded to Adi Jacobs in a gap, and the little man outstripped the defense and pulled a ham-string, fumbling over for South Africa's fifth try, resulting in a health lead of 34-3 after Butch James' conversion.

In 2009 he played the first two Tests against the British & Irish Lions as the Springboks won the series after two nail-biting victories in Durban and Pretoria.

Jacobs, who has retired from all rugby in 2012, was a devastating runner with brilliant hands in the twilight of his career, this allowed him to create opportunities by releasing players in space around him.

Adi Jacobs struggled with injuries late in his career and missed a lot of rugby for the Sharks and the Springboks and his last game for the Springboks was on 30 July 2011 against New Zealand in Wellington, aged 30.

He had 34 caps for the Springboks, with 14 coming as a substitute.

Honours
SA Rugby Young Player of the Year nominee, (2001); SA Rugby Player of the Year nominee (2008).

See also
List of South Africa national rugby union players – Springbok no. 721
List of South Africa national under-18 rugby union team players

References

External links
 Sharks profile
 
 http://en.espn.co.uk/southafricatour/rugby/player/13782.html

1980 births
Living people
Rugby union centres
South African rugby union players
South Africa international rugby union players
Sportspeople from Cape Town
Bulls (rugby union) players
Sharks (rugby union) players
Sharks (Currie Cup) players
Lions (United Rugby Championship) players
South Africa international rugby sevens players
Male rugby sevens players
Rugby union players from the Western Cape